Alfred Bayley Ridley (14 December 1849 — 26 March 1898) was an English first-class cricketer and British Army officer.

The son of The Reverend Nicholas James Ridley, he was born at in December 1849 at Hollington House in East Woodhay, Hampshire. He was educated at Eton College, before attending the Royal Military College, Sandhurst. He graduated from there as a second lieutenant into the King's Own Royal Regiment (Lancaster) in May 1878. He was promoted to lieutenant in May 1880, and shortly after served in the First Boer War. Ridley later played first-class cricket, making his debut for Hampshire against Kent at Southampton in 1884; the following year he made a second appearance against Derbyshire, in what was the second first-class match to be played at the newly constructed Northlands Road in Southampton. He scored 43 runs in these matches, in addition to taking two wickets. In the King's Own, he was promoted to captain in September 1886. Ridley died at London in March 1898, following a long illness. He was survived by his widow, Amy. His elder brother, Arthur, was also a first-class cricketer.

References

External links

1849 births
1898 deaths
People from East Woodhay
People educated at Eton College
Graduates of the Royal Military College, Sandhurst
King's Own Royal Regiment officers
British military personnel of the First Boer War
English cricketers
Hampshire cricketers